Steven Benedic Dias (born 25 December 1983) is an Indian former professional footballer and current coach of MFA Elite Division outfit Ambernath United Atlanta FC. An attacking midfielder who played on the wings, he was known for his long range shooting, crossing and passing. Dias made his debut for India in 2006 and had since become a mainstay in the Indian midfield. He is known as the "David Beckham of India".

Club career
Dias was playing for one of India's leading clubs Mahindra United (before the club withdrew from Indian football on 30 April 2010) and played in their NFL winning team, as well as in the AFC Cup.

He has since played for clubs in the I-League such as Churchill Brothers where he made 25 appearances and scored 4 goals. He has also played for Mumbai Tigers, Rangdajied United, 
Delhi Dynamos FC in the inaugural season of the ISL and Bharat FC where he made 17 appearances. He signed for Mumbai FC in 2016 after Bharat FC withdrew from the I-league.

Dias has started a club named Ambitious Football Academy in Don Bosco vidyyavihar.
He hopes to bring a sensation of football in the youth of the Mumbai.

International career
Dias made his debut for India in 2004 and was a part of the team that unsuccessfully attempted to qualify for the AFC Asian Cup 2007. He played in India's first Nehru cup title in 2007, scoring twice in a 6–0 win over Cambodia. He usually takes corners for India and scored straight from one of in a 2–2 draw against Lebanon.
He was a regular for the India national team and played an integral role in India's win in the 2008 AFC Challenge Cup. He was a key player in India's win over Syria in the Nehru Cup of 2009. He helped India qualify for the 2011 Asian Cup in Qatar. He had been chosen to be part of the 30 man squad preparing for the 2011 Asian Cup in Doha. His combination and understanding with striker, Sunil Chhetri, made them a very threatening duo. 

In 2012 AFC Challenge Cup qualification match against Pakistan he scored a goal. During the Indian Caribbean tour on 24 August 2011 Dias scored a goal against Guyana but could not stop India from losing the match 1–2.

Honours

India
 AFC Challenge Cup: 2008
 SAFF Championship: 2005, 2011; runner-up: 2008
 Nehru Cup: 2007, 2009

Political Career 
Dias joined the Shiv Sena on 3 February 2022 in the presence of Maharashtra Tourism Minister and Shiv Sena leader Aaditya Thackeray in Mumbai.

References

External links

1983 births
Indian footballers
Indian Roman Catholics
India international footballers
India youth international footballers
Footballers from Mumbai
Living people
Churchill Brothers FC Goa players
2011 AFC Asian Cup players
I-League players
Mahindra United FC players
Air India FC players
Mumbai Tigers FC players
Footballers at the 2006 Asian Games
Association football midfielders
Asian Games competitors for India
Indian Super League head coaches
Odisha FC head coaches